Coad's Green (or Coads Green) is a village in Cornwall, England, United Kingdom, located on the B3257 in a rural area to the east of Bodmin Moor, about  from the nearest town of Launceston. It is within the parish of North Hill,. It has a primary school, a Methodist church and a village hall. Historically, it has also been referred to as Coades Green. The Hocking's Green apple variety originated in Coad's Green. Group Travel's Launceston to Liskeard service (number 236) passes through the village.

References

Villages in Cornwall